Dobje pri Planini is a settlement in the Municipality of Dobje in eastern Slovenia. It is the administrative center of the municipality. It was traditionally part of the Styria region. It is now included with the rest of the municipality in the Savinja Statistical Region. It has its own primary school and post office.

Name
The name of the settlement was changed from Dobje to Dobje pri Planini in 1953.

Church
The parish church in the settlement is dedicated to the Virgin Mary and belongs to the Roman Catholic Diocese of Celje. It was first mentioned in written documents dating to 1545, but was extensively rebuilt in the 18th and 19th centuries.

Notable people
Notable people that were born in Dobje pri Planini include:
Jože Brilej (1910–1981), communist political commissar and Yugoslav politician

References

External links

Dobje pri Planini on Geopedia

Populated places in the Municipality of Dobje